Brzezinka (German Birkenau) is a village in southern Poland, site of the Auschwitz-Birkenau Nazi death camp.

Brzezinka may also refer to:

Brzezinka, Lower Silesian Voivodeship (south-west Poland)
Brzezinka, Bytów County in Pomeranian Voivodeship (north Poland)
Brzezinka, Kraków County in Lesser Poland Voivodeship (south Poland)
Brzezinka, Gmina Andrychów in Lesser Poland Voivodeship (south Poland)
Brzezinka, Gmina Brzeźnica in Lesser Poland Voivodeship (south Poland)
Brzezinka, Gmina Karczew in Masovian Voivodeship (east-central Poland)
Brzezinka, Gmina Sobienie-Jeziory in Masovian Voivodeship (east-central Poland)
Brzezinka, Greater Poland Voivodeship (west-central Poland)
Brzezinka, Lubusz Voivodeship (west Poland)
Brzezinka, Krosno Odrzańskie County in Lubusz Voivodeship (west Poland)
Brzezinka, Opole Voivodeship (south-west Poland)
Brzezinka, Słupsk County in Pomeranian Voivodeship (north Poland)
Brzezinka, West Pomeranian Voivodeship (north-west Poland)
Brzezinka, Mysłowice in Silesian Voivodeship (south Poland)
Brzezinka Średzka